Smokinya Cove is the 3.5 km wide cove on Prince Gustav Channel indenting for 2.2 km the southeast coast of Trinity Peninsula in Graham Land, Antarctica.  It is entered north of Azimuth Hill.

The cove is named after the seaside locality of Smokinya in Southeastern Bulgaria.

Location
German-British mapping in 1996.

Maps
 Trinity Peninsula. Scale 1:250000 topographic map No. 5697. Institut für Angewandte Geodäsie and British Antarctic Survey, 1996.
 Antarctic Digital Database (ADD). Scale 1:250000 topographic map of Antarctica. Scientific Committee on Antarctic Research (SCAR). Since 1993, regularly updated.

References
 Smokinya Cove. SCAR Composite Antarctic Gazetteer
 Bulgarian Antarctic Gazetteer. Antarctic Place-names Commission. (details in Bulgarian, basic data in English)

External links
 Smokinya Cove. Copernix satellite image

Coves of Graham Land
Landforms of Trinity Peninsula
Bulgaria and the Antarctic